The American Prize is a set of annual nonprofit national competitions in the performing arts which recognizes and rewards commercial and noncommercial recorded performances of classical music in the United States based on submitted applications. There is no live competition.  The award is bestowed at professional, college/university, community, and high school levels in a number of areas including composition, piano, voice, chamber music, conducting, and ensemble performance.  The jury consists of well known performing artists in each area, with the conductor and composer David Katz serving as chief judge.

Artists and ensembles self-nominate through an application process or are nominated by a teacher, parent, board member or colleague. Evaluation is a key component of the competition; applicants who reach finalist status or higher receive a written evaluation from a member of the judging panel. Among judges are composer Judith Lang Zaimont, pianist Jeffrey Biegel, and Metropolitan Opera soprano Sharon Sweet. Winners of each category receive a cash award.

Top prize winners 
Winners of the first prize award by year in all professional categories.

Composition

Piano

Voice

Chamber music

Orchestral

Choral

College/university prize winners 
Winners of the first prize award by year in college/university categories.

Composition

Voice

Orchestral

Choral

Community prize winners 
Winners of the first prize award by year in community categories.

Choral

References

External links
The American Prize
The American Prize Blog

Competitions in the United States